The Travancore National and Quilon Bank (often abbreviated as: TN&Q Bank) was a bank founded in the year 1937 in Trivandrum, India. The bank failed in spectacular circumstances in 1938.

History

Founding 

The Travancore National and Quilon Bank was the result of a 1937 merger between Travancore National Bank (founded: 1912) and Quilon Bank (founded: 1919). At that time it was the fourth largest bank in India. The founders of the bank belonged to the same business family that owned and operated the Malayala Manorama.

Management 

The bank was owned and managed largely by Christians from the Indian state of Kerala. The bank had also managed to become the fourth largest bank in India, after the Imperial Bank of India, the Central Bank of India and the Bank of India.

Failure and Final Years 

The Travancore National and Quilon Bank suspended withdrawals on June 21, 1938, and was liquidated in August 1938. The two founders of the bank, K. C. Mammen Mappillai and Chalakuzhy Paulose Mathen were both imprisoned for multiple years.

Legacy 

The bank is notable for being one of the first banks in India to have failed after the creation of the regulator and central bank, the Reserve Bank of India.

The Banking Regulation Act, 1949 was enacted into law largely as a reaction to the failure of the Travancore National and Quilon Bank. The Reserve Bank of India now wanted to have more powers to deal with failing banks and to safeguard the interests of the depositors.

See also

 Indian banking
 List of banks in India
 List of oldest banks in India
 Banking in India
 Reserve Bank of India
 Indian Financial System Code
 List of largest banks
 List of companies of India

References

External links
 History of the Bank
 Banking in India

Defunct banks of India
Companies based in Kerala
Banks based in Kerala
Financial services companies based in Kochi